Sheshan Golf Club is the first premier private golf club in Shanghai, China. Founded in 2004, the 18 hole golf course plays to a par of 72 and is designed by Nelson and Haworth Design, and spans over 7,266 yards (6,531 meters). Every year, the club plays host to the WGC-HSBC Champions, and is currently the only club to host the Championship. Sheshan Golf Club was awarded the Best Golf Course in China by Golf Digest in 2013 and currently tops of the list of Top Clubs in China by Golf Magazine.

Overview 

Sheshan has played host to the HSBC Champions since 2005, which has grown in status to become a World Golf Championship event in 2009. PGA Tour players such as Tiger Woods, Phil Mickelson, Rory McIlroy, and Lee Westwood have all participated in this tournament, making this not only the biggest golf event in Asia, but also one of the biggest golf events in the world. 2013 marked the first time that the WGC-HSBC Champions was both an official European Tour and PGA Tour event with an elevated prize purse of US $8.5 million, the highest in East Asia.

Established in 2004, Sheshan International Golf Club has received numerous worldwide accolades and awards from the international golf community. Golf Digest, Asia Golf Monthly, and the Asian Golf Association are just a few of the major organizations to honor Sheshan with many of their top awards.

WGC-HSBC Champions 
The WGC-HSBC Champions is a professional golf tournament, held annually in China, sanctioned by the International Federation of PGA Tours (Asian Tour, European Tour, Japan Golf Tour, PGA Tour, PGA Tour of Australasia and Sunshine Tour) and China Golf Association. Inaugurated in 2005, The WGC-HSBC Champions boasts of the largest purse prize in Asia-Pacific at USD$8.5million. It is also the first and only PGA Tour event with FedEx Cup schedule in China.

Initially held as the HSBC Champions from 2005–08, the tournament was elevated to World Golf Championship status in 2009. Played in November, it is the fourth tournament on the WGC calendar, with the other three events in the United States. The field consists of the world's top ranked players from the six major tours and China Golf Association, and leading money winners from respective sanctioning tours, and winners from Majors and other three WGC tournaments.

Awards and accolades 
Over the years, Sheshan Golf Club has received numerous awards and accolades for its outstanding course and club. The course was featured in EA Sports Tiger Woods PGA Tour 2009, 2010, 2011, 2012, and 2014.

References

External links
 

Golf clubs and courses in China
Sports venues in Shanghai